Francesca Cristiana Conti (born 21 May 1972 in Genzano di Roma) is a female water polo goalkeeper from Italy, who won the gold medal with the Women's National Team at the 2004 Summer Olympics in Athens, Greece.

See also
 Italy women's Olympic water polo team records and statistics
 List of Olympic champions in women's water polo
 List of Olympic medalists in water polo (women)
 List of women's Olympic water polo tournament goalkeepers
 List of world champions in women's water polo
 List of World Aquatics Championships medalists in water polo

References

External links
 

1972 births
Living people
People from Genzano di Roma
Italian female water polo players
Water polo goalkeepers
Water polo players at the 2004 Summer Olympics
Medalists at the 2004 Summer Olympics
Olympic gold medalists for Italy in water polo
World Aquatics Championships medalists in water polo
Sportspeople from the Metropolitan City of Rome Capital
21st-century Italian women